Neal Bryce is a retired Zambian international lawn bowler.

Bowls career
He won a silver medal in the singles at the 1970 British Commonwealth Games in Edinburgh.

References

Living people
Commonwealth Games silver medallists for Zambia
Commonwealth Games medallists in lawn bowls
Bowls players at the 1970 British Commonwealth Games
Year of birth missing (living people)
Medallists at the 1970 British Commonwealth Games